In set theory, a branch of mathematics, a Reinhardt cardinal is a kind of large cardinal. Reinhardt cardinals are considered under ZF (Zermelo–Fraenkel set theory without the Axiom of Choice), because they are inconsistent with ZFC (ZF with the Axiom of Choice). They were suggested  by American mathematician William Nelson Reinhardt (1939–1998).

Definition
A Reinhardt cardinal is the critical point of a non-trivial elementary embedding  of  into itself.

This definition refers explicitly to the proper class . In standard ZF, classes are of the form  for some set  and formula . But it was shown in 
that no such class is an elementary embedding . So Reinhardt cardinals are inconsistent with this notion of class.

There are other formulations of Reinhardt cardinals which are not known to be inconsistent. Another is to use a class theory such as  NBG or KM, which admit classes which need not be definable in the sense above.

Kunen's inconsistency theorem

 proved his inconsistency theorem, showing  that the existence of an elementary embedding  contradicts NBG with the axiom of choice (and ZFC extended by ). His proof uses the axiom of choice, and it  is still an open question as to whether such an embedding is consistent with NBG without the axiom of choice (or with ZF plus the extra symbol  and its attendant axioms).

as it is a consequence of NBG, and hence does not require the assumption that  is a definable class.
Also, assuming  exists, then there is an elementary embedding of a transitive model  of ZFC (in fact Goedel's constructible universe ) into itself.

Stronger axioms

There are some variations of Reinhardt cardinals, forming a hierarchy of hypotheses asserting the existence of elementary embeddings .

J3:  There is a nontrivial elementary embedding 
J2:  There is a nontrivial elementary embedding  and DC holds, where  is the least fixed-point above the critical point.

Each of J1 and J2 immediately imply J3. A cardinal  as in J1 is known as a super Reinhardt cardinal.

Berkeley cardinals are stronger large cardinals suggested by Woodin.

See also
 List of large cardinal properties

References

External links

Large cardinals